Map of places in Orkney compiled from this list
See the list of places in Scotland for places in other counties.

Orkney is an archipelago located in the Northern Isles of Scotland. Having been inhabited for nearly 8,500 years, Orkney contains many settlements, hamlet and villages.

A
Abune-the-Hill
Aikerness
Aikers
Aith

B
Backaland
Backaskaill
Balfour
Beaquoy
Berstane
Bimbister
Birsay 
Boloquoy
Bow
Braehead
Braeswick
Breckquoy
Brims
Brinian
Brinkie's Brae
Brinyan
Brough of Birsay
Broughton
Broughtown
Burness
Burray
Burwick
Bustatown

C
Calfsound
Cantick Head
Cleat
Clestrain
Clouston
Cornquoy
Costa

D
Deerness
Dishes
Dounby

E
Easting
Eastside
Eday
Edmonstone
Egilsay
Elwick
Everbay
Evie

F
Finstown
Firth
Flotta
Foubister

G
Georth
Gills Bay
Gorseness
Graemsay
Greenigo
Grim Ness
Grimbister
Gritley
Grobister
Guith
Gyre

H
Hackland
Hackness
Halcro
Hamnavoe
Harray
Hatston
Heddle
Herston
Hobbister
Holland
Hollandstoun
Holm
Housebay
Houton
Hoxa
Hoy
Hrossey
Hurliness

I
Innertown
Ireland
Isbister

K
Kettletoft
Kirbister
Kirbuster
Kirkwall
Knarston

L
Lady
Lamb Holm
Laminess
Langskaill
Liddle; see Liddle Burnt Mound
Linklater
Linklet
Linksness
Longhope
Loth
Lower Whitehall
Lowertown
Lyness
Lythes

M
Maeshowe
Mainland, Orkney
Manse Bay
Marwick
Melsetter
Midbea
Midhowe
Millbounds
Mirbister
Murra

N
Navershaw
Ness of Tenston
Nesstoun
Nether Button
Netherbrough
Newark
Newbigging
North Dawn
North Ronaldsay
Northdyke
Northtown
Nouster

O
Odie
Orphir
Outertown
Overbister

P
Pan
Papa Westray
Papley
Pierowall

Q
Quholm
Quindry
Quoyloo
Quoyness

R
Rackwick
Rapness
Redland
Rendall
Rinnigill
Roadside
Ronaldsvoe
Rothiesholm
Rousay
Russland

S
Sabiston
Saltness
Samsonslane
Sanday
Sandgarth
Sandquoy
Sandwick 
Saviskaill
Scapa
Scar
Scarwell
Settiscarth
Shapinsay
Skaill
Skara Brae
Skeabrae
Skelwick
Sourin
South Ronaldsay
Southtown
St Margaret's Hope
St Mary's
St Ola
Stenness
Stove
Stromness
Stronsay
Swanbister
Swannay

T
Tankerness
Tingwall
Toab
Tradespark
Twatt

U
Upper Sanday
Uppertown

V
Veness
Voy

W
Warbeth
Wasbister
Westness
Westray
Whitehall
Widewall
Woodwick
Work
Wyre

Y
Yesnaby

See also
List of places in Scotland
List of islands of Scotland
List of Orkney islands

Geography of Orkney
Lists of places in Scotland
Places
Orkney
Populated places in Scotland